Chippenham Mead is a town green in Monmouth, Wales. The mead is registered common land and stands between Blestium Street and the River Wye, intersected by the A40(T) Monmouth bypass. There is a sports area within the park called Chippenham Sports Ground. The mead is listed at Grade II on the Cadw/ICOMOS Register of Parks and Gardens of Special Historic Interest in Wales.

History
The mead has been also known as Chippenham Fields, Chippenham Park, Chippenham Gate and Monmouth Sports Ground. Between 1734 and 1893, Chippenham was used annually for horse racing. Sometime between 1893 and 1900, the racing moved to Vauxhall Fields, where racing ended in 1933. This ended almost 200 years of racing in Monmouth.  Early race cards from newspapers like the London Evening Post refer to the course as Chippenham Mead. Initially the event was five days but then moved to a two-day event by 1880. Monmouth races were a two-day annual event in the late 1860s and early 1870s, for example held on 22 and 23 September in 1870. The Great Western Railway often advertised "CHEAP RETURN TICKETS" for the special event.

Between 1876 and 1880, the race meet did not take place.  On Tuesday 28 September 1880, the races returned.  The Western Mail newspaper of 31 July 1880 heralded the return of Monmouth races and claimed that "Monmouth races were among the oldest in England, for in the  printed by order of his Most Gracious Majesty dated 1739, we find two days good racing accounted for at the town of Monmouth".

In 1925 a single engined Avro 504K bi-plane registered as G-EATB crashed landed on Chippenham Mead. The circumstances surrounding the incident are not known.

In 2022 Chippenham Mead was designated Grade II on the Cadw/ICOMOS Register of Parks and Gardens of Special Historic Interest in Wales.

Current usage
Chippenham Sports Ground, also known as Little Chippenham, is run by Monmouth Sports Association and is made up of and used by Monmouth Tennis Club, Monmouth Bowls Club and bowling green, Monmouth Cricket Club, Monmouth Rugby Football Club and Monmouth Town F.C., known as The Kingfishers. It is the Welsh base for Cricketers with a Disability.

In 2021 a new children's play area was opened on the mead, and the old site, closer to the dual carriageway, was returned to grassland.

Gallery

Notes

Defunct horse racing venues in Wales
Monmouth, Wales
Parks in Monmouthshire
Sports venues completed in 1734
Common land in Wales
Registered historic parks and gardens in Monmouthshire